Alex Valle, also known as CaliPower and Mr. Street Fighter, is a Peruvian-American professional fighting game player. Valle is mainly a Ryu specialist and is considered one of the most influential people within the fighting game community.

Gaming career
The first tournament Valle entered was an original Street Fighter II tourney using Ken, in which he lost to a Guile and a Dhalsim player. Valle's original competition was John "Choiboy" Choi and Mike "Watts" Watson. He was also the first American to ever face Daigo Umehara in a tournament: the Street Fighter Alpha 3 World Championships in 1998. In the tournament, Valle lost to Umehara in an outstanding comeback. From 2002 to 2010, Valle has had 10 Top 8 performances  Valle is known for innovating the "Valle CC (Custom Combo)" which was his key to winning the Battle By the Bay Street Fighter Alpha 2 tournament, the predecessor of the Evolution Championship Series (EVO).

After three years of not making a Top 8 at EVO, Valle took a 4th-place finish at EVO 2013 for Street Fighter X Tekken using a team of Yoshimitsu and Lars, being defeated by Justin Wong. Valle later took a 4th-place finish at Capcom Cup 2013, losing an "epic" runback against Dexter "Tampa Bison" James. According to an interview with Canadian Smasher Toronto Joe, Valle was impressed with the Super Smash Bros. Melee scene in SoCal. When Toronto Joe asked for advice for building a community, Valle responded "Find a group of dedicated people willing to lend a hand and create frequent events. Community building takes a long time so have realistic expectations and cater to your scene directly." When Toronto Joe asked how the Fighting Game Community stands out compared to other game genres, such as first-person shooters and MOBAs, Valle stated that "[t]he FGC started in arcades where you had to take out the player next to you. The social interaction is what makes every match interesting because we instantly feel our opponents struggle for each defeat." Valle was excited for Super Smash Bros. 4 and he felt interested in showcasing the game at upcoming tournaments.

Valle competed in an early preview of Ultra Street Fighter IVs Omega Mode, in which he lost against Ryan "Filipino Champ" Ramirez. Valle is known for having an offensive playstyle when playing with Ryu, as determined by Justin Wong in his Step Up Your Game series of articles. Valle announced his retirement from competitive gaming in April 2017.

Personal life
Valle is the CEO and co-founder of Level Up and is the man behind the SoCal Regionals tournaments as well as the Wednesday Night Fights Online Tournaments. Valle formerly ran ReveLAtions, The Runback, and Super Smash Sundays; the former being a major that happens once a year, and the latter two being weeklies. He was born in Lima, Peru.

Tournament results

References and notes

External links
 Alex Valle's Player Profile - Shoryuken Rankings
 Alex Valle on Facebook
 Alex Valle on Twitter
 Alex Valle on Twitch

Living people
People from Westminster, California
Sportspeople from Orange County, California
American esports players
Fighting game players
American sportspeople of Peruvian descent
Sportspeople from Lima
Marvel vs. Capcom players
Street Fighter players
Year of birth missing (living people)